Pearce Quigley is an English actor of the stage and screen.
He plays Will in the BBC Radio 4 Sitcom Alone.

Theatre credits
The Seagull (Royal Court); Paul (National Theatre); Journey's End (Comedy Theatre); My Night with Reg and Dealer's Choice (Birmingham Rep); Feelgood (Hampstead and Garrick); Blue Heart (Royal Court); Shopping and Fucking (Out of Joint at Gielgud, International Tour and Queen's Theatre); The Queen and I - The Royals Down Under (Out of Joint Australian tour); Rat in the Skull (Royal Court and Duke of York's); The Queen and I (Out of Joint at the Royal Court and Vaudeville Theatre); Road (Out of Joint at the Royal Court); Der Neue Menoza (Gate Theatre); Rope (Birmingham Rep); A Jovial Crew (RSC); The Winter's Tale (RSC); The Merry Wives of Windsor (RSC); The Changeling (RSC); Abingdon Square (Shared Experience); Doctor Faustus (Globe), A Midsummer Night's Dream (Globe) and The Taming of the Shrew (Globe).

Television
Quigley has appeared in Queer As Folk, Prime Suspect, New Tricks, The Virgin Queen, Inspector Morse (The Infernal Serpent (series 4, episode 1)), Cutting It, Happiness, Lead Balloon as well as other roles. He has also worked in film. On 12 October 2008, he appeared as the dog trainer in Peter Kay's Britain's Got The Pop Factor ... And Possibly A New Celebrity Jesus Christ Soapstar Superstar Strictly On Ice, a spoof on the talent show genre of programmes.

In 2011, he played Uncle Fred in Frankenstein's Wedding and in 2013 played Dave in the BBC comedy-drama Being Eileen. He also appeared in the Midsomer Murders episode "Death and the Divas". Between 2014 and 2022, Quigley played the part of Russell in the television sitcom Detectorists.

In December 2021, Quigley played The Ghost of Christmas Present in the BBC TV special — We Wish You A Mandy Christmas.

References

External links
 

Year of birth missing (living people)
Living people
Male actors from Salford
English male stage actors
English male television actors
20th-century English male actors
21st-century English male actors